Siri Perera QC (February 1910 – 1995) was a Criminal lawyer, a Buddhist leader who was one time the President of the Colombo YMBA. He was also a former Sri Lanka High Commissioner to India.

Early life and education
Perera was educated at Nalanda College Colombo. He was also a member of the teaching staff at Nalanda. He was also a graduate of Sri Lanka Law College. He obtained a First Class in the Final Examination and was enrolled as an Advocate of the Supreme Court of Sri Lanka in March 1933.

Criminal lawyer
In Perera's career as a criminal lawyer he appeared for some well known cases such as Galle Face flats murder case, Turf Club robbery and murder case, Matara Police Station murder case and Dematagoda acid bath murder case.

See also

Sri Lankan Non Career Diplomats

References

 By Rajah Kuruppu - Vice President Colombo YMBA 
 By Rajah Kuruppu 
 By L. V. P. Wettasinghe 
 By Ronnie de Mel 
 Reviewed by Dhanapala Nissanka 
 

1910 births
1995 deaths
Sinhalese lawyers
Sri Lankan Buddhists
Alumni of Nalanda College, Colombo
High Commissioners of Sri Lanka to India
Faculty of Nalanda College, Colombo